Morehead may refer to:
 Morehead (surname)
 Morehead languages of New Guinea

Places

Places in United States
 Morehead, Kentucky
 Morehead City, North Carolina

Morehead, Kentucky institutions
 Morehead State University
 Morehead State Eagles, sports teams

Places in Papua New Guinea
 Morehead Rural LLG

See also
 Moorhead (disambiguation)
 Morehead Scholarship